North Lakhimpur College is an autonomous college, affiliated to Dibrugarh University in North Lakhimpur on the north bank of the Brahmaputra river in upper Assam. North Lakhimpur college is the first autonomous college in Assam. The college was established in 1952. In 2012, North Lakhimpur College was accredited with an "A" grade by the NAAC with a CGPA of 3.08. On 30 May 2013, North Lakhimpur College received a letter from the University Grants Commission granting it the status of an autonomous college. North Lakhimpur College is the first college from Assam to receive this status from the UGC.

History
The North Lakhimpur College is the oldest and premier institution of higher education in upper Assam. It was established on 3 July 1952 at North Lakhimpur, which was recognized as a backward and remote area. The college was a fruit of the efforts and zeal of a core group of far-sighted people in particular and the people of this vast region in general.

Organisation and administration

Governance 

The principal is Biman Ch. Chetia, MSc, MPhil, PhD, from February 2012 to present.

Past principals
 Md. Nasim Ali Hazarika, MA, LLB (1952–1954)
 Dr. Biswanarayan Sastri, MA, PhD (1954–1958)
 Jogananda Borgohain, MA (1958–1985)
 Labanya Charan Deka, MA, LLB (I/C) (1985–1986)
 Harendra Deva Goswami, MA (I/C) (1986–1989)
 Hemendra Kumar Gogoi, MSc, MPhil (1989–2001)
 Dibyajyoti Phukan, MA (I/C) (March 2001–Sept 2001)
 Tilak Ch. Baruah, MSc, MPhil (I/C) (Oct 2001–July 2004)
 Dr. Jugada Phukan, MA, PhD, (I/C) (Aug 2004–Sept 2004)
 Achyut Ch. Mahanta, MA (I/C) (Nov 2004–July 2005)
 Dr. Suryabhushan Pandu, MSc, PhD, FISPP (Aug 2005–Dec 2005)
 Dr. Budhin Baruah, MSc, PhD (Jan 2006–Dec 2011)

Departments

Arts
 Anthropology Department
  English Department
  Assamese Department
 Hindi Department
 Economics Department
 Education Department
 Geography Department
 History Department
 Political Science Department
 Philosophy Department
 Mathematics Department

Science
 Botany Department
 Zoology Department
 Chemistry Department
 Physics Department
 Electronics Department
 Computer Science Department
 Statistical Science Department
 Economics Department
 Anthropology Department
 Mathematics Department
 Home Science Department

Facilities

Library
Career Counselling
Training for Competitive Examinations
Boys Hostels
New Boys Hostel
Girls Hostel
Gymnasium
Playground

Academics

The college offers major (honours) courses in almost all customary subjects in the Arts and Science streams. It has 19 departments. The college accommodates nearly 1,000 students in the undergraduate courses, and it receives inter-state students.

Courses
The college offers following courses. 
 Higher Secondary (Arts and Science)
 Bachelor's degree (Arts and Science)
 Computer Science Degree (BCA)
 PG Diploma Courses
Plant tissue-culture postgraduate diploma
Disaster Management postgraduate diploma
 UG Diploma
 Certificate Courses
Human Rights Diploma
Electronics Appliances Repairing Diploma
Herbal Plantation Diploma
 Foundation Courses
 UGC Career Oriented Courses

The college also offers the courses of Indira Gandhi National Open University and Krishna Kanta Handique State Open University in the respective study centers of the open Universities in the college.

References

External links

North Lakhimpur College

Universities and colleges in Assam
North Lakhimpur
Colleges affiliated to Dibrugarh University
Educational institutions established in 1952
1952 establishments in Assam